The Jackson Rancheria Casino Resort is a hotel, casino, and resort with restaurants, owned and operated by the Jackson Rancheria Band of Miwuk Indians, and located in Jackson, California.

Notes

External links
 

Miwok
Amador County, California
Casinos in California
Native American casinos
Native American history of California